The O2 Apollo Manchester (known locally as The Apollo and formerly Manchester Apollo) is a concert venue in Ardwick Green, Manchester, England. It is a Grade II listed building, with a capacity of 3,500 (2,514 standing, 986 seats).

History
The building was designed by architects Peter Cummings, Alex Irvine, and R. Gillespie Williams, in an Art Deco style. The building's frontage consists of a glazed white terracotta façade. Its original purpose was as a multi-purpose cinema and variety hall and was opened on 29 August 1938 by actress Margaret Lockwood.

It was taken over by Associated British Cinemas in 1943, but it began to host pop concerts in the 1960s. The Beatles performed at two shows here on 20 November 1963 which were filmed, in colour. They performed here again on 7 December 1965.
 
In the 1970s, it stopped presenting films and became solely a concert venue.

It also hosts seated events to a capacity of 2,693. Split into two levels, the upstairs contains permanently fitted seating, whereas the larger downstairs can be altered to suit the event; both levels view a single concert stage. The venue has no air-conditioning except in the "Whiteroom" hospitality area.

It was the biggest venue in Manchester before the 21,000-capacity NYNEX Arena, now Manchester Arena, opened in 1995.

The venue hosts a large number of popular music-based concerts and other events throughout the year.

Concert management and advertisement is handled by Live Nation, merchandise is sold by the permanent resident concession company CMI Ltd, and first aid cover for all events is provided by St. John Ambulance.

In September 2010, the venue was rebranded as the O2 Apollo Manchester, following a sponsorship deal with O2.

See also

Listed buildings in Manchester-M12

References
Notes

Bibliography

External links

1938 establishments in England
Buildings and structures completed in 1938
Former cinemas in Manchester
Music venues in Manchester
Art Deco architecture in England
Wrestling venues